Bay Lake is an unincorporated community in Bay Lake Township, Crow Wing County, Minnesota, United States, near Deerwood. It is along State Highway 6 (MN 6) near the junction with Crow Wing County Road 14.

References

Unincorporated communities in Crow Wing County, Minnesota
Unincorporated communities in Minnesota